Istarske Toplice, previously known as Terme Santo Stefano, is a thermal health resort in the central part of Istria, Croatia, in the village of Gradinje. It is located 11 kilometres southwest of town of Buzet, in the canyon part of the Mirna river.

Sources

External links

 
Istarske toplice 

Spa towns in Croatia
Buildings and structures in Istria County
Hot springs of Croatia
Tourist attractions in Istria County